Igor Bandović (Serbian: Игор Бандовић; born on 27 January 1977, Užice, Socialist Federal Republic of Yugoslavia) is a Serbian jurist and Director of Belgrade Centre for Security Policy. Before that from 2008 until 2019, he was Senior Programme Manager for the European Fund for the Balkans.

Biography  

He was born on 27 January 1977 in Užice, where he finished Užice Gymnasium. He studied international law and international relations in Belgrade.

In 1997 he founded a non-governmental organization called "Libergraf", which promoted human rights and social activism through informal education. From 2002 to 2006 he worked as a researcher in Belgrade Centre for Human Rights, specializing in human rights, civil society and nationalism.

From 2006 to 2008 he worked for the International Organization for Migration and the United Nations Development Programme.

From 2009 to 2011 he worked in Gallup Balkan Monitor, a subsidiary of Gallup. From 2008 onward, he has been employed as a Senior Programme Manager for the European Fund for the Balkans. On 18 October 2019, during the closure of Belgrade Security Forum it was announced that he will become new director of Belgrade Centre for Security Policy, the role which he formally assumed in November 2019.

He is one of the coordinators of Balkan in Europe Policy Advisory Group and "Think and Link-Regional Policy Programme“.

Selected publications

References

External links 
 Igor Bandovic on BIEPAG website
 Bandović about the nationalism in Balkan region in Serbian.

1977 births
People from Užice
Serbian jurists
Living people